Laura Montalvo and Paola Suárez were the defending champions but lost in the final 6–4, 2–6, 6–4 against Tathiana Garbin and Janette Husárová.

Seeds
Champion seeds are indicated in bold text while text in italics indicates the round in which those seeds were eliminated.

 Laura Montalvo /  Paola Suárez (final)
 Tathiana Garbin /  Janette Husárová (champions)
 Sylvia Plischke /  Patricia Wartusch (first round)
 Rosa María Andrés /  Cristina Torrens Valero (first round)

Draw

References
 2001 Copa Colsanitas Doubles Draw

Copa Colsanitas
2001 WTA Tour